John Rathbone (c. 1750–1807) was an English artist.

He was born in Cheshire about 1750, and practised in Manchester, London, and Preston as a landscape-painter in both oil and watercolour. Although he gained the name of the ‘Manchester Wilson’, his works in oil are opaque, flat, and ineffective. His works in watercolour, though in the light and washed style then practised, are well drawn and interesting. The British Museum possesses three of his watercolour drawings, all of which are landscapes with figures, and there is a cleverly drawn landscape by him in grey faded tints at South Kensington. There is a landscape in oils in the Walker Art Gallery, Liverpool, by Rathbone, and two hang in the Peel Park Art Gallery, Salford. Between 1785 and 1806 Rathbone exhibited forty-eight landscapes at the Royal Academy and two at the Society of Artists. He also exhibited three landscapes at the exhibition of the Society of Artists in Liverpool in August 1774. Rathbone died in 1807.

Notes 

 Attribution

See also 

18th-century English painters
English male painters
19th-century English painters
1750s births
1807 deaths
People from Cheshire (before 1974)
English landscape painters
19th-century English male artists
18th-century English male artists